"Blow" is a song by American rapper Moneybagg Yo, released on September 22, 2022. It was produced by DrumGod, ShortyyK and Rizzo8.

Background
Moneybagg Yo released the song on his 31st birthday. Previously, he teased the song on Apple Music 1 and told Zane Lowe how it was made: "The vibe... it was just a party, birthday club vibe. I made it probably a month ago but then I was making it intentionally for my birthday, you know what I'm saying? Just trying to put out a birthday song, do a record."

Content
The song finds Moneybagg Yo boasting about his wealth and detailing his lifestyle, specifically his ability to "blow" money on luxury items (including clothes, diamonds and cars) and women. He first outlines his plan for his birthday, before listing off his purchases.

Charts

References

2022 singles
2022 songs
Moneybagg Yo songs
Interscope Records singles
Songs about birthdays